The Merry Cavalier is a 1926 American silent drama film directed by Noel M. Smith and starring Richard Talmadge, Charlotte Stevens and William H. Tooker.

Plot

Cast
 Richard Talmadge as Dick Hemper
 Charlotte Stevens as Nan Cosgrove
 William H. Tooker as Dave Hemper
 Joseph Harrington as Luke Cosgrove
 Broderick O'Farrell as Physician 
 Jack Richardson as Mel Bronson

References

Bibliography
 Munden, Kenneth White. The American Film Institute Catalog of Motion Pictures Produced in the United States, Part 1. University of California Press, 1997.

External links
 

1926 films
1926 drama films
1920s English-language films
American silent feature films
Silent American drama films
American black-and-white films
Films directed by Noel M. Smith
Film Booking Offices of America films
1920s American films